Dragon Ball Z: Bardock – The Father of Goku, known in Japan as , is the first Dragon Ball Z TV special, which is based on the popular manga Dragon Ball. It was broadcast on Fuji Television on October 17, 1990, between Dragon Ball Z episodes 63 and 64. It serves as a prequel to the Dragon Ball anime, taking place twelve years before the events in the Emperor Pilaf saga. AB Groupe's title is Dragon Ball Z: The Father of Goku. In 2011, a sequel manga called Dragon Ball: Episode of Bardock was created and adapted into a short film.

Plot

Bardock, a low-level Saiyan soldier and his crew are on an assignment to slaughter the inhabitants of Planet Kanassa. They manage to accomplish this by using the planet's full moon to transform into Great Apes. The next morning, Bardock and his crew rest and celebrate their victory until one surviving Kanassan warrior catches him off-guard and decides to give him the "gift" of seeing the future as his way to avenge his people, before being killed by Bardock who subsequently passes out. Bardock returns to Planet Vegeta to heal and visits his infant son, Kakarot, who is being prepared to be sent to Earth in order to exterminate all life there. Bardock starts to have visions of Kakarot fighting future foes, as well as Planet Vegeta's destruction at the hands of Frieza, the emperor of the Universe and overseer of the Saiyans. Bardock dismisses the visions and goes to join his team on Planet Meat, only to discover most of them dead, and his best friend Tora mortally wounded. Before he succumbs to his injuries, Tora reveals that Bardock's squad was betrayed and killed by Frieza's henchman Dodoria and his elite soldiers, and that Frieza ordered the attack on the crew due to him becoming paranoid about the growing power of the Saiyans. Horrified and enraged by his fallen friend's last words, he then battles Dodoria's soldiers and defeats them all, only to be easily overwhelmed by a single mouth blast from Dodoria. He is left severely injured, but manages to return to Planet Vegeta.

Now realizing that Frieza intends to destroy the entire Saiyan race, Bardock attempts to convince the other Saiyans of the danger that they are all in, but his claims are laughed off and ignored. Bardock thus begins a final one-man assault against Frieza and his men. After fighting his way through Frieza's soldiers, Bardock sends a large energy blast at the tyrant himself. However, Frieza counters this with his deadly Gigantic Death Ball, killing Bardock, many of his own soldiers, and destroys Planet Vegeta. As he perishes, Bardock has one final vision of the future: Kakarot facing off against Frieza. Assured that Kakarot will be the one to defeat Frieza, Bardock smiles as he along with Planet Vegeta are engulfed by the energy bomb. After his demise, Bardock telepathically wishes Kakarot to carry out his will and avenge his people and their home planet, also stating his one regret of not holding his child when he still had the chance. At the same moment, Kakarot, who is hurtling toward Earth in his space pod, wakes up. Elsewhere, having just completed an assignment on a faraway world, Vegeta, the Saiyan Prince, is informed by his colleague Nappa of his homeworld's destruction, and that Frieza claims that the planet was destroyed by a meteor. Vegeta's pride keeps him from expressing his shock, and he remains outwardly emotionless. Soon afterwards, Kakarot's space pod touches down on Earth, where he is found by an elderly man, Gohan and giggles happily in the old man's arms. Gohan then decides to adopt the boy as his own grandson, and gives him a new name – Goku.

During the ending credits, Goku's battles against the Red Ribbon Army, Tien Shinhan, King Piccolo, Piccolo, Nappa and Vegeta are shown, culminating with an image of Goku about to battle Frieza, with the spirits of Bardock and his team watching.

Cast

Music
OP (Opening Theme):
 "CHA-LA HEAD-CHA-LA"
 Lyrics by Yukinojō Mori
 Music by Chiho Kiyooka
 Arranged by Kenji Yamamoto
 Performed by Hironobu Kageyama
IN (Insert Song):
 
 Music and arrangement: 
 Voice: TOKIO
 Instrumentation: Dragon Magic Orchestra
ED (Ending Theme):
 
 Lyrics by Dai Satō
 Music by Chiho Kiyooka
 Arranged by Kenji Yamamoto
 Performed by Hironobu Kageyama and KŪKO (Waffle)

The song "Solid State Scouter" by Dragon Magic Orchestra is a homage to the Japanese synthpop band Yellow Magic Orchestra, specifically their 1979 album Solid State Survivor.

Funimation dub soundtrack
The following songs were present in the Funimation dub of Bardock – The Father of Goku: The remaining pieces of background music were composed by Mark Akin, Andy Baylor and Dale D. Kelly.

 Saliva – "Superstar"
 Caviar – "The Good Times Are Over"
 Sum 41 – "Makes No Difference"
 American Hi-Fi – "A Bigger Mood"

However, the TV special on Double Feature, there is an alternate audio track containing the English dub with original Japanese background music by Shunsuke Kikuchi.

Reception

Critical response
Chris Beveridge	of Mania.com says that "Bardock getting explored a bit more is definitely a positive, and surely could carry an arc himself if not more in giving us the Saiyan view of things pre-Freeza and though the early part of it."

Box office
On November 3 and 5, 2018 it had a joint limited theatrical release with a film Dragon Ball Z: Fusion Reborn (1995), titled as Dragon Ball Z: Saiyan Double Feature, by Fathom Events in the United States due to the upcoming release of Dragon Ball Super: Broly (2018). According to Box Office Mojo, as of November 7, the Saiyan Double Feature made a revenue of $540,707.

Releases
It was released on VHS in North America in November 2000, then on DVD in January 2001. They later released the double feature with a first special and The History of Trunks with digitally remastered widescreen format on DVD on February 19, 2008, then on Blu-ray released on July 15, 2008. The first special was re-released to DVD on September 15, 2009, in a remastered-widescreen single-disc edition.

References

External links

 Official anime website of Toei Animation
Dragon Ball Z: Bardock – The Father of Goku at the Internet Movie Database
 

1990 films
1990 anime films
1990 television films
1990 television specials
1990s Japanese-language films
Japanese television specials
Action anime and manga
Anime spin-offs
Film spin-offs
Bardock - The Father of Goku
Funimation
1990s animated television specials
Films scored by Shunsuke Kikuchi
Genocide in fiction
Works set on fictional planets